Eupithecia sophia is a moth in the family Geometridae first described by Arthur Gardiner Butler in 1878. It is found on the Kuriles, in Japan, Korea and western China.

The wingspan is 13–14 mm. The ground colour of the forewings is greyish. The hindwings are whitish with greyish transverse lines.

References

Moths described in 1878
sophia
Moths of Asia